JP Putevi Srbije or Roads of Serbia, is a Serbian construction company headquartered in Belgrade, Serbia. It is the national road construction company of Serbia.

Organization
Putevi Srbija was established by the Enactment of the Government of Serbia, as the state-owned enterprise responsible for "professional activities referring to permanent, continuous and good-quality maintenance and preservation, exploitation, construction, reconstruction, organization and control of toll collection, development and management of I and II category state roads in the Republic of Serbia". In current form, it operates since 20 February 2006.

As of December 2019, the total state roads network in Serbia is as follows:
 Ia category (motorways) – 
 Ib category – 
 IIa category – 
 IIb category – 

In January 2018, the Government of Serbia led by the Minister of Construction, Transportation and Infrastructure Zorana Mihajlović stated that the Government plans reorganization of "Putevi Srbije" and eventual merging of "Putevi Srbije" with specialized motorways construction company "Koridori Srbije".

See also
 Roads in Serbia
 Motorways in Serbia

References

External links
 
 Sa 5 milijardi evra - putevi “k’o bombona” at b92.net 

2006 establishments in Serbia
Companies based in Belgrade
Construction and civil engineering companies of Serbia
Government-owned companies of Serbia
Serbian companies established in 2006
Construction and civil engineering companies established in 2006